Tom Rees (18 May 1895 – 17 September 1916) was a British Army officer who served in the Royal Flying Corps during the First World War. Joining the military in early 1915, Rees was raised to the rank of lieutenant before his 21st birthday, and eventually reached captain on the day of his death. He was killed on 17 September 1916 while flying as an observer in an F.E.2b aircraft, which was shot down by Manfred von Richthofen, the German flying ace who was later known as the "Red Baron". The aircraft was the first of Richthofen's 80 credited aerial combat victories.

Early life
The son of Thomas Rees and Alice Rees (née Evans), he was the youngest of their six children. He attended Brecon Boys' County School, before commencing at the University College of Wales at Aberystwyth in 1912. He was considered a scholar and was described as a smart university student.

Military career
While Rees was at Aberystwyth University, he joined the Officers' Training Corps, and upon his graduation with a bachelor of arts degree, volunteered for war service, and joined the Army. On 21 January 1915, he was commissioned as a second lieutenant in the Royal Welch Fusiliers, an infantry regiment, and he was subsequently posted to that regiment's 14th (Service) Battalion, briefly serving with them on the Western Front. He volunteered to join the Royal Flying Corps in November 1915 and returned to the United Kingdom for aircrew training. Upon graduating, he was posted to No. 11 Squadron and returned to the front. He had earned early promotion to lieutenant as a result of his "academic abilities" prior to his transfer and this was later followed by advancement to captain, which was promulgated on 17 September 1916.

Death

On Sunday, 17 September 1916, Rees was the observer in a two-man F. E. 2b, serial number 7018, piloted by Second Lieutenant Lionel Morris. They were part of a group of eight Royal Aircraft Factory B.E.2cs and six F.E.2b escorts from the Royal Flying Corps 3rd Brigade. As the formation returned from bombing the railway station at Marcoing, they encountered a group of about 20 German aircraft from Jasta 2. Manfred von Richthofen, who later came to be known as the "Red Baron", was newly assigned to Jasta 2, and was under the tutelage of Oswald Boelcke. Upon sighting the British aircraft, Boelcke gave the sign to attack, but held back himself. In the ensuing fight, two aircraft from No. 12 Squadron RFC and four from No. 11 Squadron were shot down, including Rees and Morris' aircraft, which was shot down by von Richthofen. Rees was killed during the dogfight with von Richthofen; this was the "Red Baron's" first official victory.

Von Richtofen recalled getting a superior position on a two-seater British plane for his first confirmed kill. “I gave a short series of shots with my machine gun.” In the dogfight, von Richtofen said he "had gone so close that I was afraid I might dash into the Englishman. Suddenly, I nearly yelled with joy for the propeller of the enemy machine had stopped turning.”

For von Richthofen, this was the first of the 80 confirmed aerial combat victories with which he was credited before his death in April 1918. The circumstances foreshadowed his death later in the war. His account of the event noted that the pilot was probably experienced, as he appeared conscious of the danger he was in and did his best to escape, as von Richthofen manoeuvred his new Albatros D.II serial number 491/16, into position to attack. Rees, in the observer's position, fired constantly from the forward-facing Lewis machine gun (which could also be turned to fire backwards over the pilot). Von Richthofen recounted that at the time he was not sure whether the F.E.2b would fall, until he was able to close up behind it during a moment of nonevasive flying, taking advantage of the F.E.2b's vulnerability underneath. After he fired, the propeller stopped turning, indicating that he must have hit the engine. Rees was not visible and the plane was flying unsteadily, indicating to von Richthofen that both British men had been injured. Morris managed to land the aeroplane at a nearby German airfield at Flesquières. Von Richthofen followed the F. E. 2b down and saw the dead observer and badly wounded pilot (who died later the same day), then flew back to his squadron's base at Bertincourt.

He contacted a jeweller in Berlin and ordered a silver cup engraved with the date and the type of enemy aircraft ("1. Vickers 2. 17.9.16"). He continued to celebrate each of his victories in the same manner until he had 60 cups, by which time the dwindling supply of silver in blockaded Germany meant that silver cups could no longer be supplied. Von Richthofen discontinued his orders at this stage, rather than accept cups made from base metal.

Manfred von Richthofen later recalled, "I was animated by a single thought: the man in front of me must come down". He closed in to point-blank range, opened fire, and "suddenly the opponent's propeller turned no more.  Hit!"  The plane evidently lacked the speed to return to its own lines.  When it was forced down, von Richthofen landed his craft near the aircraft and documented his kill. This delayed his return to the Jasta headquarters, and he explained the delay with "One Englishman shot down"..

Rees was buried with full military honours by the Germans. According to von Richthofen, he "honoured the fallen enemy by placing a stone on his beautiful grave." His remains were reinterred in Grave C 2 of the town cemetery, Mynwent Cymunedol Villers-Plouich Communal Cemetery at Villers Plouich.  Rees's family learnt of his death in November 1916, on the morning of the funeral of his older brother David John, who had been killed in a tree-felling accident adjacent to the family farm. 

Morris is buried at Cambrai, Porte de Paris Cemetery, Grave: I A 16.

Rees was described to Morris' father, in a letter from the pilot of another aircraft that was also shot down, as being "a very capable and plucky observer".

Legacy
After his death, Rees was nominated for a Mention in Despatches, for his "excellent work as an observer" by his commanding officer, who cited that he had flown many sorties between July and September 1916, before being posted as missing in action. He was later awarded the 1914–15 Star, the British War Medal, and the British Victory Medal for war service. In 1999, Rees's war medals were sold at auction, and fetched £4,500 (circa US$7,200) because of their historical significance.

For the 100th anniversary of Rees and Morris' deaths, descendants of von Richthofen and Rees and Morris met each other for the first time.

See also

References
Notes

Citations

Further reading

 

 at Project Gutenberg

External links
Villers Plouich: Grave of Tom Rees and others

1895 births
1916 deaths
Aviators killed by being shot down
British military personnel killed in World War I
Manfred von Richthofen
People from Brecon
British Army personnel of World War I
Royal Flying Corps officers
Welsh aviators
Royal Welch Fusiliers officers